Wrentham is a town in Norfolk County, Massachusetts, United States. The population was 12,178 at the 2020 census.

History

In 1660, five men from Dedham were sent to explore the lakes near George Indian's wigwam and to report back to the selectmen what they found. The report of those men, Daniel Fisher, Anthony Fisher, Sgt. Fuller, Richard Ellis, and Richard Wheeler, was received with such enthusiasm that in March 1661 it was voted to start a new settlement there. The Town then voted to send Ellis and Timothy Dwight to go negotiate with King Phillip to purchase the title to the area known as Wollomonopoag.

They purchased 600 acres of land for £24, 6s. The money was paid out of pocket by Captain Willett, who accompanied Ellis and Dwight. The Town voted to assess a tax upon the cow commons to repay him, but some thought the money should be paid by those who would be moving to the new village. The dispute resulted in Willet not being paid back for several years.

After the boundaries of the new community were set, the Town voted to give up all rights to the land in return for the proprietors paying Dedham £160 over four years, beginning in 1661. By January 1663, however, little progress had been made towards establishing a new village. A meeting was called, and the 10 men who volunteered to go raised several concerns about their ability to move forward.

After much discussion, it was decided not to give the 600 acres to the group of pre-selected men, but rather to lay out lots and then award them by lottery. Those who already began to improve their lots were allowed to keep them, and land for a church, burial ground, training ground, roads, and officer lots were not included. All were free to buy and sell their lots.

Not much happened at Wollomonopoag until 1668, at which time a report arrived of native peoples planting corn and cutting down trees on the land that Dedham had purchased. Eleazer Lusher was charged with sending the illiterate Indians a letter warning them to "depart from that place and trespass no further." Samuel Fisher then took it to them and read it aloud, at which point they replied that they had every intention of remaining on the land. Though they had still not paid him back for the land in question, the Town then asked Willett to speak with King Phillip and ask that he intervene.

There is no record of Phillip's response to that entreaty but, in August 1669, the Town Fathers received an odd letter from him offering to negotiate for more land if they would quickly send him a "holland shirt." Dwight and four others were appointed to negotiate with him again, provided Phillip could prove he, and not another sachem, had the rights to the land. In November, an agreement was reached to clear the title for £17 0s 8d. There is no record of whether a shirt was traded.

Samuel Sheares lived alone at Wollomonopoag for some time before a new attempt at a settlement was undertaken in 1671. Five men, John Thurston, Thomas Thurston, Robert Weare, John Weare, and Joseph Cheeney moved there with him, followed the next year by Rev. Samuel Man, a one-time teacher in the Dedham Public Schools. Robert Crossman was employed at the same time to construct a corn mill.

Those who moved there were drawn from the middle class of Dedham. They were primarily people from outside of Dedham who had purchased land there, and second generation Dedhamites who moved without their parents. Without the outsides, it is questionable whether the new community would have survived.

Soon, however, the Wollomonopoag settlers complained that those in the village center were keeping them in a state of colonial dependency. They were upset about absentee landlords whose land values were going up thanks to the labor of the inhabitants and who refused to pay taxes to support the community. They also complained that with the seat of the town government being so far away that they were disenfranchised and best by a lack of capital. Constables refused to travel to Wollomonopoag to make collections, assessments, and social judgement.

With the blessing of Dedham's Board of Selectmen, the General Court separated the new town of Wrentham on October 16, 1673.

It was burned down during King Philip's War 1675–1676. In the nineteenth century, Wrentham was the site of Day's Academy. For a short time, Wrentham was the residence of the educational reformer Horace Mann. It is also known as one of the residences of Helen Keller.

Geography
Wrentham is bordered by Norfolk on the north, Foxboro on the east, Plainville and Cumberland, Rhode Island on the south, Bellingham on the southwest, and Franklin on the west. It has two large lakes towards the center of town, Lake Pearl and Lake Archer, as well as Mirror Lake on the Wrentham/Norfolk border and numerous smaller lakes. Sheldonville, or West Wrentham, is a rural section of Wrentham located on the western leg of town. Sheldonville still maintains a unique identity as the old farming section of Wrentham, has active commercial orchards, and has its own ZIP Code (02070). Wrentham drains into four watersheds. They are the Charles River to the north, the Taunton River to the east, the Blackstone River to the west, and the Ten Mile River to the south.

Wrentham is the only town of that name in the United States. It is named after the village of Wrentham, Suffolk, England. The only other Wrentham is Wrentham, Alberta. Wrentham, Massachusetts, is by far the most populous of the three.

Demographics

As of the census of 2000, there were 10,554 people, 3,402 households, and 2,653 families residing in the town. The racial makeup of the town was 97.64% White, 0.61% African American, 0.12% Native American, 0.80% Asian, 0.01% Pacific Islander, 0.32% from other races, and 0.50% from two or more races. Hispanic or Latino of any race were 0.79% of the population.

There were 3,402 households, out of which 43.0% had children under the age of 18 living with them, 68.3% were married couples living together, 6.6% had a female householder with no husband present, and 22.0% were non-families. 17.0% of all households were made up of individuals, and 7.0% had someone living alone who was 65 years of age or older.  The average household size was 2.89 and the average family size was 3.31.

In the town, the population was spread out, with 27.8% under the age of 18, 4.8% from 18 to 24, 31.4% from 25 to 44, 24.4% from 45 to 64, and 11.6% who were 65 years of age or older.  The median age was 39 years. For every 100 females, there were 95.7 males.  For every 100 females age 18 and over, there were 92.4 males.

The median income for a household in the town was $78,043.50, and the median income for a family was $89,058.99. Males had a median income of $58,776 versus $37,219 for females. The per capita income for the town was $30,792.56.  About 1.6% of families and 3.9% of the population were below the poverty line, including 4.2% of those under age 18 and 10.5% of those age 65 or over.

Government

Local

Wrentham has a board of selectmen style government. The town is governed by five selectmen, each elected for three year staggered terms. The current members are Joseph F. Botaish II, Christopher Gallo, Charles Kennedy, James Anderson, and William Harrington.

In addition to the select board, there exist 12 other boards and committees in town. This includes the Board of Assessors, Board of Health, Community Preservation Committee, Conservation Commission, Cultural Council, Economic Development Commission, Finance Committee, Historical Commission, Open Space Committee, Planning Board, Recreation Commission, and Zoning Board of Appeals. 

State

The town is part of the Massachusetts Senate's Norfolk, Bristol and Middlesex district where it has been represented by Rebecca Rausch since 2019. Since 2023 Marcus Vaughn, a Republican, has represented the town in the Massachusetts House of Representatives (9th Norfolk district).

Federal

Federally, Wrentham is part of Massachusetts's 4th congressional district, represented by Democrat Jake Auchincloss, elected in 2020.
Elizabeth Warren and Edward Markey represent the town in the United States Senate. One of the state's former members of the United States Senate is Republican Scott Brown, a resident of Wrentham, who was elected via special election on January 19, 2010, and served until January 2013.

Education

The Wrentham Elementary School consists of three buildings which separate the different grade levels.  There is the Delaney Elementary School for the lowest grades, the Vogel Elementary School for a mix of lower grades and unified arts, and the Roderick Elementary School for the highest grades (up to grade 6).  All 3 of these buildings are located on one Wrentham Elementary School campus located off of Taunton St & Randall Rd in the center of Wrentham.

For secondary education Wrentham is in the King Philip Regional School District, which operates the public middle school and the comprehensive high school for Wrentham. King Philip Regional High School, located on Franklin St, is the town's public high school and serves students from Wrentham, Norfolk, and Plainville.  Students in middle school attend King Philip Regional Middle School in Norfolk. Surrounding high schools, such as Tri-County Regional Vocational Technical High School in Franklin, and Norfolk County Agricultural High School in Walpole, as well as the Catholic Bishop Feehan High School in Attleboro, are also available to Wrentham students.

Transportation

Wrentham is a member of the Greater Attleboro Taunton Regional Transit Authority.

Notable people

 Dale Arnold, Co-Host of the WEEI-FM Dale & Keefe Afternoon Show from 2:00 PM – 6:00 PM and The Boston Bruins Pre and Post Game shows on NESN lived in Duluth prior to moving back to Maine
 Ayla Brown, singer and basketball player; daughter of Scott Brown
 Scott Brown, former U.S. Ambassador to New Zealand and Samoa; lived in Wrentham while being a Republican United States Senator from Massachusetts from 2010 to 2013
 John Cena, professional wrestler and actor (formerly owned a home on Lake Archer) 
 Cesar Chelor, the earliest documented African-American plane maker in North America
 Chris Doughty, businessman and politician who ran in the 2022 Massachusetts Gubernatorial elections as a Republican
 Charlotte W. Hawes, composer
 Gail Huff, Former News Reporter for WCVB-TV and wife of Scott Brown
 Helen Keller, Moved to Wrentham in 1905 and resided in the town for over a decade. It was during this time she joined the Socialist Party of Massachusetts, became a suffragist, and published several books
 Jake Layman, NBA basketball player
 Garth Snow, former NHL goaltender and former GM of the New York Islanders
 Scott Zolak, former NFL quarterback and current host/color commentator for 98.5 FM The Sports Hub

Explanatory notes

Citations

Works cited

External links

 Wrentham's Home Page
 King Philip Regional School District Home Page
 Wrentham Public Schools
 The Wrentham Times
 Wrentham Cable Access
 Wrentham Patch, published by AOL Inc.

 
1660 establishments in Massachusetts
Populated places established in 1660
Towns in Massachusetts
Towns in Norfolk County, Massachusetts